This is a list of winners and nominees of the Primetime Emmy Award for Outstanding Guest Actor in a Comedy Series. Prior to 1988 the category was not gender specific, thus was called Outstanding Guest Performer in a Comedy Series. These awards, like the other "Guest" awards, are not presented at the Primetime Emmy Award ceremony, but rather at the Creative Arts Emmy Award ceremony.

Winners and nominations

1970s

1980s

1990s

2000s

2010s

2020s

Individuals with multiple wins

3 wins
 Mel Brooks (consecutive)

2 wins
 Dave Chappelle
 Tim Conway
 Jimmy Fallon
 Jay Thomas (consecutive)
 Justin Timberlake

Programs with multiple awards

7 awards
 Saturday Night Live (2 consecutive)

4 awards
 Mad About You (3 consecutive)

3 awards
 Murphy Brown (2 consecutive)
 Will & Grace (2 consecutive)

2 awards
 Frasier (consecutive)
 Monk

Individuals with multiple nominations

6 nominations
 Nathan Lane

5 nominations
 Fred Willard

4 nominations
 Will Arnett
 Mel Brooks
 Jon Hamm

3 nominations
 Alec Baldwin
 Bobby Cannavale
 Louis C.K.
 John Cleese
 Bill Hader
 Anthony LaPaglia
 Bob Newhart
 Justin Timberlake

2 nominations
 Hank Azaria
 Beau Bridges
 Roscoe Lee Browne
 Steve Buscemi
 Sid Caesar
 Dave Chappelle
 Tim Conway
 Matt Damon
 Danny DeVito
 David Duchovny
 Herb Edelman
 Jimmy Fallon
 Victor Garber
 Will Geer
 Luke Kirby
 Lin-Manuel Miranda
 Brad Pitt
 Carl Reiner
 Martin Sheen
 Jay Thomas
 Bradley Whitford

Programs with multiple nominations

24 nominations
 Saturday Night Live

14 nominations
 30 Rock

13 nominations
 Frasier

9 nominations
 Will & Grace

8 nominations
 The Golden Girls

7 nominations
 The Cosby Show
 Mad About You
 Murphy Brown

6 nominations
 Friends
 Modern Family

5 nominations
 Seinfeld

4 nominations
 Curb Your Enthusiasm
 Veep

3 nominations
 The Big Bang Theory
 Cheers
 Dream On
 Everybody Loves Raymond
 Extras
 Girls
 The Larry Sanders Show
 The Marvelous Mrs. Maisel
 Nurse Jackie

2 nominations
 3rd Rock from the Sun
 Coach
 Glee
 Life with Bonnie
 Monk
 My Name Is Earl
 Ted Lasso
 Transparent
 The Wonder Years

Notes

References

Guest Actor - Comedy Series